The 2000 Alfred Dunhill Cup was the 16th and final Alfred Dunhill Cup. It was a team tournament featuring 16 countries, each represented by three players. The Cup was played 12–15 October at the Old Course at St Andrews in Scotland. The sponsor was the Alfred Dunhill company. The Spanish team of Miguel Ángel Jiménez, Miguel Ángel Martín, and José María Olazábal beat the South African team of Ernie Els, David Frost, and Retief Goosen in the final. It was the second win for Spain. The tournament was replaced by the Alfred Dunhill Links Championship in 2001, an official European Tour event.

Format
The Cup was a match play event played over four days. The teams were divided into four four-team groups. The top eight teams were seeded with the remaining teams randomly placed in the bracket. After three rounds of round-robin play, the top team in each group advanced to a single elimination playoff.

In each team match, the three players were paired with their opponents and played 18 holes at medal match play. Matches tied at the end of 18 holes were extended to a sudden-death playoff, unless they could not affect the outcome of the tournament (semi-finals). The tie-breaker within a group was based on match record, then head-to-head.

Group play

Round one
Source:

Group 1

Group 2

Turner won on the first playoff hole.

Group 3

Group 4

Round two
Source:

Group 1

Chapman won on the first playoff hole.

Strüver won on the first playoff hole.

Group 2

Goosen won on the first playoff hole.

Group 3

Group 4

Round three
Source:

Group 1

Woosnam won on the second playoff hole.

Group 2

Goosen won on the first playoff hole.

Group 3

Group 4

Aoki won on the third playoff hole.

Standings

Playoffs
Source:

Bracket

Semi-finals

Final

Martín won on the first playoff hole.

Team results

Player results

References

External links
Coverage on the European Tour's official site

Alfred Dunhill Cup
Alfred Dunhill Cup
Alfred Dunhill Cup
Alfred Dunhill Cup